Red Light Fever may refer to:

 "Red Light Fever", a song from Liz Phair's 2003 self-titled album
 Red Light Fever (Hot Leg album), 2009 
 Red Light Fever (Taylor Hawkins and the Coattail Riders album), 2010
 "Red Light Fever", a song from Venom's Welcome to Hell